Patrol Base Diamond III (also known as Firebase Diamond III) is a former U.S. Army base southeast of Tây Ninh in southern Vietnam.

History
The base was established on 14 April 1969 by the 2nd Battalion, 27th Infantry Regiment during Operation Toan Thang III 10 km southwest of Go Dau Ha and 2 km east of the Parrot's Beak, Cambodia.

At 03:00 on 15 April 1969 the base was attacked by People's Army of Vietnam (PAVN)/Vietcong (VC) forces. The base was hit by over 350 Rocket-propelled grenades and over 150 82mm mortar rounds followed by a ground attack. Two howitzer sections at the base fired over 350 high-explosive and 12 Beehive rounds while nearby artillery units fired a further 500 high-explosive and 40 Firecracker rounds in support of the base. The attack was repulsed with 198 PAVN/VC killed and eight captured and 40 individual and 42 crew-served weapons captured; U.S. losses were 13 killed.

Current use
The base has reverted to farmland.

References

Installations of the United States Army in South Vietnam
Buildings and structures in Tây Ninh province